The Rhinoceros Party (sometimes referred to in English as the Second Rhinoceros Party), officially the Parti Rhinocéros Party, is a Canadian federal-level  political party. It was known as neorhino.ca until 2010, when the party changed its name, registering a new party logo. It was created in Montreal on May 21, 2006, and recognized by Elections Canada as being eligible for registration on August 16, 2007, and an official political party on August 23, 2007. It is the successor to the Rhinoceros Party of Canada.

The party was founded by François "Yo" Gourd, who was involved with the original incarnation of the First Rhinoceros Party. He has said that he named the new party (then under the name "neorhino") for the Rhinoceros Party and for Neo, the Matrix character. The party is led by Sébastien Côrriveau (who used the names "Sébastien CôRhino Côrriveau" and "Sébastien CoRhino" when running in the 2015 and 2019 federal elections, respectively).

It promises, like its predecessor, not to keep any of its promises if elected.

Rhinoceros Party of Canada (1963–1993)

The Rhinoceros Party was a registered political party in Canada from the 1960s to the 1990s. Operating within the tradition of political satire, the Rhinoceros Party's basic credo, their so-called primal promise, was "a promise to keep none of our promises".  They then promised outlandishly impossible schemes designed to amuse and entertain the voting public.

The Rhinos were started in 1963 by Jacques Ferron, "Éminence de la Grande Corne du parti Rhinocéros". In the 1970s, a group of artists joined the party and created a comedic political platform to contest the federal election. Ferron (1979), poet Gaston Miron (1972) and singer Michel Rivard (1980) ran against Prime Minister Pierre Trudeau in his Montreal seat.

The party claimed to be the spiritual descendants of Cacareco, a Brazilian rhinoceros who was "elected" member of São Paulo's city council in 1958, and listed Cornelius the First, a rhinoceros from the Granby Zoo, east of Montreal, as its leader. It declared that the rhinoceros was an appropriate symbol for a political party since politicians, by nature, are: "thick-skinned, slow-moving, dim-witted, can move fast as hell when in danger, and have large, hairy horns growing out of the middle of their faces".

Some members of the Rhino party would call themselves Marxist-Lennonist, a parody of the factional split between the Communist Party of Canada and the Communist Party of Canada (Marxist-Leninist), although the Rhinoceros Party meant the term in reference to Groucho Marx and John Lennon.

The party used as its logo a woodcut of a rhinoceros by Albrecht Dürer, with the words D'une mare à l'autre (a French translation of Canada's Latin motto a mari usque ad mare, playing on the word mare, which means pond in French) at the top.

Policies and politics

In addition to the national platform promises released by the party leadership, individual candidates also had considerable freedom to campaign on their own ideas and slogans. Bryan Gold of the Rhinoceros Party described the party platform as two feet high and made of wood: "My platform is the one I'm standing on". A candidate named Ted "not too" Sharp ran in Flora MacDonald's Kingston and the Islands riding with the campaign slogan "Fauna, not flora", promising to give fauna equal representation. He also took a stand on abortion (promising, if elected, never to have an abortion) and capital punishment: "If it was good enough for my grandfather, then it's good enough for me". To strengthen Canada's military, Sharp planned to tow Antarctica north to the Arctic Circle: "Once we have Antarctica, we'll control all of the world's cold. If another Cold War starts, we'll be unbeatable".

In the 1988 election, the Rhinoceros Party ran a candidate named John Turner in the same riding as Liberal leader John Turner, and received 760 votes. Penny Hoar, a safe sex activist, distributed condoms in Toronto while running under the slogan: "Politicians screw you—protect yourself".

1979 campaign
Government:
The Queen of Canada would be seated in Buckingham, Quebec.
Rather than awarding money as prizes in the lottery, the winners would be appointed to the Senate of Canada.
Rather than patriate the constitution by bringing it to Canada, as proposed by Pierre Trudeau, the Rhinoceros Party pledged to bring Great Britain home and make it Canada's eleventh province.
Energy:
Building one nuclear power plant per household, including monthly distributions of lead underwear to Canadians.  Indoor lighting would then be provided by radioactive citizens.
Burning all the standing barns in Canada to provide energy, under the slogan Burn a barn for Britain.
Gender issues:
Alimony payments would go directly to the federal government, and responsibility for withholding those payments would fall upon the federal government.
Men would be allowed to work as prostitutes, wet nurses, secretaries and receptionists.

1984 campaign
Economy
The Rhinoceros Party pledged to eliminate small businesses, and replace them with very small businesses, having less than one employee.
Candidate Graham Ashley, standing in Ottawa-Vanier, pledged to take Canada off the Gold Standard, and implement a Snow Standard, which would improve the economy until the summer.
Public works
Candidate Stardust the Magician promised to put a roof on Olympic Stadium, using only a $25-million handkerchief.

Other campaigns 
Other platform promises of the Rhinoceros Party included:
 Repealing the law of gravity
 Providing higher education by building taller schools
 Instituting English, French and illiteracy as Canada's three official languages
 Tearing down the Rocky Mountains so that Albertans could see the Pacific sunset
 Eliminating unemployment by abolishing Statistics Canada, thereby eliminating the bureaucrats that measure unemployment.
 Making Montreal the Venice of North America by damming the St. Lawrence River
 Abolishing the environment because it's too hard to keep clean and it takes up so much space
 Annexing the United States, which would take its place as the third territory in Canada's backyard (after the Yukon and the Northwest Territories—Nunavut did not yet exist), in order to eliminate foreign control of Canada's natural resources
 Ending crime by abolishing all laws
 To provide more parking in the Maritimes by paving the Bay of Fundy, and to create the world's largest parking by paving the province of Manitoba
 Turning Montreal's Saint Catherine Street into the world's longest bowling alley
 Amending Canada's Freedom of Information Act: "Nothing is free anymore; Canadians should have to pay for their information".
 Making the Canadian climate more temperate by tapping into the natural resource of hot air in Ottawa.
 Storing nuclear waste in the Senate: "After all, we've been storing political waste there for years".
 Adopting the British system of driving on the left; this was to be gradually phased in over five years with large trucks and tractors first, then buses, eventually including small cars, and bicycles and wheelchairs last.
 Selling the Senate of Canada at an antique auction in California
 Putting the national debt on Visa
 Declaring war on Belgium because a Belgian cartoon character, Tintin, killed a rhinoceros in one of the cartoons
 Offering to call off the proposed Belgium-Canada war if Belgium delivered a case of mussels and a case of Belgian beer to Rhinoceros "Hindquarters" in Montreal (the Belgian Embassy in Ottawa did, in fact, do this)
 Painting Canada's coastal sea limits in watercolour so that Canadian fish would know where they were at all times
 Banning guns and butter, since both kill
 Banning lousy Canadian winters
 Building a bridge spanning the country, from Vancouver Island to Newfoundland.
 Making the Trans-Canada Highway one way only.
 Changing Canada's currency to bubble gum, so it could be inflated or deflated at will.
 Donating a free rhinoceros to every aspiring artist in Canada
 Counting the Thousand Islands to see if the Americans have stolen any
 Knocking down the Rocky Mountains and building giant bicycle paths sloping downhill in both directions, so Canadians could coast from coast to coast.

The Rhino Party also declared that, should they somehow actually win an election, they would immediately dissolve and force a second election: "We Rhinos think that elections are so much fun, we want to hold them all the time". They also declared victory after one election, claiming all candidates were Rhinoceroses, whether they knew or acknowledged it: thick-skinned, short-sighted, mean-tempered, etc.

Notable candidates
Michel Rivard once went on television  (during free air time given to political parties) and stated: "I have but two things to say to you: Celery and Sidewalk. Thank you, good night".

A British Columbia splinter group proposed running a professional dominatrix for the position of party whip, renaming "British Columbia" to "La La Land", moving the provincial capital, and merging with the Progressive Conservative Party so as "not to split the silly vote".

Although not recognized in the United States, former baseball pitcher Bill Lee ran for President of the United States in 1988 on the Rhinoceros Party ticket.

In the 2019 Canadian federal election, the Rhinoceros Party ran a candidate named Maxime Bernier in the riding of Beauce against the incumbent, unrelated Maxime Bernier, leader of the People's Party of Canada. Neither candidate won, with both being defeated by Conservative Party candidate Richard Lehoux.

Electoral record
The Rhinoceros Party never succeeded in winning a seat in the House of Commons. In the 1984 federal election, however, the party won the fourth-largest number of votes, after the three main political parties, but ahead of several well-established minor parties. Rhino candidates sometimes came in second in certain ridings, humiliating traditional Canadian parties in the process. In the 1980 federal election, for instance, the Rhinoceros party nominated a professional clown/comedian named Sonia "Chatouille" Côté ("chatouille" means "Tickles" in French) in the Laurier riding in Montréal. Côté came in second place, after the successful Liberal candidate, but ahead of both other major parties: the third place New Democrat, and the fourth-place Progressive Conservative candidate. Chatouille received almost twice as many votes as the PC candidate.

Early in the party's history, when it was mainly composed of French-speaking Québécois, they chose their only unilingual anglophone party member as their official translator.

Electoral results

Note:

(1) The Rhinoceros Party ran 12 candidates in the 1972 election, but was not recognized as a registered party by Elections Canada, and therefore its candidates were listed as independents. (Source: Toronto Star, October 31, 1972.)

1993 abstention and subsequent dissolution
The party abstained from the 1993 federal election while they questioned the constitutionality of new rules that required the party to run candidates in at least 50 ridings at a cost of $1,000 per candidature.  On September 23, 1993, Canada's Chief Electoral Officer, Jean-Pierre Kingsley, refused to accept the party's abstention and ordered the removal of the Rhinoceros Party from the Registry of Canadian Political Parties, effectively eliminating them from the Canadian political system. Kingsley also directed the party's official agent, Charlie (le Concierge) McKenzie, to liquidate all party assets and return any revenues to the Receiver General of Canada. On instructions from the party, McKenzie refused. After two years of threatening letters, Ottawa refused to prosecute McKenzie, who now claims to hold the distinction of being Canada's "least-wanted fugitive".

In 2001, Brian "Godzilla" Salmi, who received his nickname because of the Godzilla suit he wore while campaigning, tried to revive the Rhinoceros Party to contest the British Columbia provincial election. While they pulled some pranks that earned some media coverage, only two of its candidates (Liar Liar in Vancouver-Mount Pleasant and Helvis in Vancouver-Burrard) appeared on the ballots, as the party claimed the $1000 candidate registration fee was a financial hardship. Unregistered candidates included Geoff Berner, who received national wire service coverage for promising "cocaine and whores to potential investors". The party disbanded shortly thereafter.

Successors
François Gourd, a prominent Rhino, later started another political movement, the entartistes, who attracted attention in the 1990s by planting cream pies in the faces of various Canadian politicians. In 2006, he led a group that set up Neorhino.ca in an attempt to recapture the Rhinoceros Party spirit, and ran as a Neorhino candidate in the 2007 Outremont by-election.

Other Rhinoceros Party members founded the Parti citron (Lemon Party), which attempted to bring a similar perspective to provincial politics in Quebec.

After the party's dissolution, a number of independent election candidates informally claimed the Rhinoceros Party label even though the party itself no longer existed. There were also a number of unsuccessful attempts to revive the Rhinos as a legally incorporated political party, though this was not fully achieved until Neorhino.ca.

Neorhino.ca
On August 7, 2007, Brian Salmi, then-president of the Rhinoceros Party, announced a $50-million lawsuit contesting an election reform law that had stripped his party of its registered status in 1993.

Legally changing his name to Sa Tan, he had planned to run under the Rhino banner in the September 2007 by-election. However, a previous law from 1993 stated that registered parties must run candidates in at least 50 ridings, at a cost of $1,000 per riding, to keep their status. In protest of the new law, the party planned to abstain from the election. Canada's then-chief electoral officer, Jean-Pierre Kingsley, rejected the abstention and ordered the party removed from the registry of Canadian political parties. The lawsuit was filed as a result of the removal from the national party registry by Mr. Kingsley. Since Salmi had legally changed his name, the lawsuit was filed as Sa Tan vs. Her Majesty The Queen.

The lawsuit was dropped after the ruling of the chief electoral officer was reversed in a new law passed in 2004 that said a party only had to run one candidate in a federal election or federal by-election to be considered registered.

Electoral record
To date, candidates of Neorhino.ca and the Rhinoceros Party have not recorded any electoral victories. Before the Neorhino.ca candidates that stood for the ridings of Outremont and Saint-Hyacinthe—Bagot in the 2007 federal by-elections, Neorhino.ca and the Rhinoceros Party before them had not fielded a candidate since Bryan Gold's failed bid to win a 1990 by-election in the New Brunswick electoral district of Beauséjour.

Neorhino.ca candidates did not win any seats in the 2007 by-elections, the 2008 federal election, or the 2011 federal election.

2007/2008 by-elections

2008 federal election

2009 by-elections

Rhinoceros Party
The party changed from neorhino.ca to its new formal name of the Rhinoceros Party in mid-2010. It also registered a new logo with Elections Canada.

2011 candidates

2015 candidates 

On August 17, Sébastien CôRhino declared in Montréal he was willing to nationalize Tim Hortons and privatize the Royal Canadian Army at the same time : "We'll look at the results after five years, after 10 years, after 50 years and with the results of these studies we'll be able to determine if other economic sectors should also be nationalized or be privatized."
Montreal candidate Ben 97 also publicly announce he wants to move the capital to Kapuskasing, Ontario. That would bring democracy closer to Canadians, because Kapuskasing is in the center of Canada.

2019 candidates 
List of candidates and election results:

2021 candidates
List of candidates and election results:

Platform

2019 campaign:

 National Defence
 The Rhinoceros Party says that National Defense is their number one priority.
 The Economy
 The Rhinoceros Party says that the Economy is their number one priority.
 The party plans to open tax havens in all provinces to keep foreign funds "local".
 By 2022, the party pledges to complete the privatization of the Senate initiated by previous governments.
 Fill the coffers of the state by allowing advertising in the Senate and the House of Commons.
 To stimulate the economy, were it to be elected,  the party would change 25 cents into thirty-cents. In this way, taxpayers would see their income increase by 16%!
 Education
 The Rhinoceros Party says that education is the number one priority
Replace teachers on leave with photos of famous scientists.
 Employment
 The Rhinoceros Party says that employment is the number one priority
By 2020 all citizens will have a job and some will even have two.
 Rewrite the Labour Code in order to add one holiday per month. April 1 and the birthday of the party leader will also become holidays. Finally, it will be forbidden to work the day after a holiday.
 Reduce the number of accidents in factories by wrapping all workers in bubble wrap.
 Green Plan
 The Rhinoceros Party says that the Environment is the number one priority
Green cars are not available in sufficient numbers in Canada. Car manufacturers would be forced to build more green cars: forest green, pale green, khaki green and neon green.
 Scientists predict that in the next 20 years, global warming will threaten the existence of human beings. The party says they can make it happen in 10 years!
 In order to fight global warming, all citizens will be forced to leave their windows open in the summer and to operate the air conditioning to the maximum.
 Bribe the Weather Network hosts to announce more sunshine on the weekend and less snow in the winter.
Use global warming to Canada's advantage, making the country warmer, shortening winters, and creating an agriculture industry in the territories.
 Justice
 The Rhinoceros Party says that justice is the number one priority
In the interests of equity among all Canadian provinces, the War Measures Act will be applied to the 9 provinces that did not have the privilege in October 1970.
 Canadian Heritage
 The Rhinoceros Party says that Canadian Heritage is the number one priority
Make "Sorry" the new official motto of Canada.
 Nationalize bacon.
 To create a more egalitarian Canada, all maps will be redrawn so that all provinces are rectangular like Saskatchewan.
 Make illiteracy the third official language of Canada.
 International relationships
 The Rhinoceros Party says that International relationships are THE number one priority
Following the Trudeau government's inaction, the magnetic pole moved from Canada to Russia. The Rhinoceros Party has promised to bring it back.
 Finished, ambassador appointments in a partisan and arbitrary way! The ambassador positions will now be sold to the highest bidders.
 Annexation of Massachusetts to have champion sports teams again.
 Health
 The Rhinoceros Party says that health is the number one priority
Reduce traffic in emergency rooms across Canada by eliminating waiting rooms.
 To counter the shortage of doctors and nurses, all employees will be provided with steroids to increase their performance.
 Public security
 The Rhinoceros Party says that public security is the number one priority
To help victims of identity theft, a new name and birth date will be provided to citizens who request it.
 To increase the safety of Canadian children, the name of newborns must be at least 12 letters, including a capital letter, a number and a special character.

If elected, the Rhinoceros Party of Canada has promised to:
 Take Canada off the gold standard, opting instead to use a snow standard to boost the economy
 Repeal the law of gravity
 Promote higher education by building taller schools
 Pave the Bay of Fundy to make more parking for the Maritimes
 Count the Thousand Islands to make sure the Americans didn’t steal any
 Change Montreal’s rue Ste-Catherine into the world’s longest bowling alley
 Ban crappy Canadian winters
 Abolish all laws to end crime
 Tear down the Rockies so Albertans can see the Pacific sunset
 Abolish lawn mowing in Outremont, QC
 Ban guns and butter—both kill
 Reform the retail lottery scheme by replacing cash prizes with Senate appointments
 Forget having two official languages; replace with having two official ears (In French, the same word is used for "language" and for "tongue")
 Seat the Queen of Canada in Buckingham, Quebec
 Privatize the Queen
 Tax the black market
 Nationalize Tim Hortons
 Move the national capital to Kapuskasing, Ontario to be closer to the centre of the country
In order to increase car pooling and reduce road speeds, car manufacturers will need to move the brake pedal to the passenger side.
 Rename black ice to neon yellow ice.
 During a storm all speed limits will be eliminated to make sure Canadians spend as little time on the roads as possible in order to reduce the likelihood of a collision.
 Use rubber instead of concrete when building roads in major cities to reduce the number of injuries to cyclists.
 Encouraged by the success of law that now allows motorists to turn right on a red light, the party will now allow them to turn left or go straight.
 Mandate archaeologists to discover if remains of roads actually exist under Montreal potholes.
 Promote MP fitness by having them cross the floor daily.
 Transport oil and gas in blimps instead of pipelines.

Archives 
There is Rhinoceros Party fonds at Library and Archives Canada.

See also
 :Category:Rhinoceros Party politicians
 List of frivolous political parties
 Independent Rhinoceros candidates in the 1997 Canadian federal election
 Non-human electoral candidates

References

External links
Official website
Rhinoceros Party – Canadian Political Parties and Political Interest Groups - Web Archive created by the University of Toronto Libraries

Federal political parties in Canada
Joke political parties in Canada
Political parties established in 2007